Sharon Lee Kennedy (born March 15, 1962) is an American jurist from Hamilton, Ohio who serves as an associate justice of the Ohio Supreme Court, after being elected on November 6, 2012. In 2022, she was elected to serve as the Chief Justice of the Ohio Supreme Court.

Early life and education

Sharon L. Kennedy was born March 15, 1962 in Hamilton County, Ohio. She graduated from Northwest High School in 1980, and from the University of Cincinnati School of Social Work with a bachelor's degree in 1984 and she received a Juris Doctor from the University of Cincinnati College of Law in 1991.

Professional career

Kennedy was a police officer with the Hamilton, Ohio Police Department from 1985 to 1989. She was then a law clerk for Judge Matthew J. Crehan and director of the victim/witness division for the Butler County Court of Common Pleas from 1989 to 1991.

After graduating from law school, Kennedy was in private practice, 1991 to 1998; during the same time period she served as disciplinary counsel for the Fraternal Order of Police, Lodge 38, representing police officers during disciplinary hearings. From 1995 to 1998, she was special counsel for then-Ohio Attorney General Betty Montgomery. From 1995 to 1998, she was the magistrate and warrant officer for the Butler County Area Courts. From 1996 to 1997, she was a warrant and compliance officer of the Butler County Juvenile Court.

Judicial career

Butler County Court of Common Pleas 
From 1999 to 2012, Kennedy was judge of the Court of Common Pleas, Domestic Relations Division, for Butler County. She also served concurrently as administrative judge from 2005 to 2012.

Ohio Supreme Court 
Kennedy entered the March 6, 2012 Republican Party primary election for the unexpired term ending December 31, 2014, on the Supreme Court of Ohio. She ran unopposed, and received 753,072 votes. On November 6, 2012, she defeated incumbent Democratic candidate Yvette McGee Brown, who had been appointed to the seat on January 1, 2011, by Ohio Governor Ted Strickland. She was sworn in December 7, 2012, after the election was certified.

Judicial ethics 
Kennedy's ethics were questioned in 2022 after she spoke to a Republican organization and called the issue of redistricting "the fight of our life," and made accusations about progressive groups and individuals, including those who are parties to cases pending before the court.

2022 Campaign for chief justice 
Kennedy, who was re-elected in 2020, ran to replace Maureen O'Connor as Chief Justice of the Ohio Supreme Court. Her opponent was fellow associate justice, Democrat Jennifer Brunner. Kennedy went on to win the race.

Personal 
Kennedy is single. She lives in Liberty Township, Butler County, Ohio. She has been a member of the Butler County Bar Association since 1991 and a member of the Federalist Society since 2012.

References

External links

|-

1962 births
21st-century American judges
21st-century American women judges
American women police officers
Chief Justices of the Ohio Supreme Court
Federalist Society members
Justices of the Ohio Supreme Court
Living people
Ohio Republicans
Ohio state court judges
Politicians from Hamilton, Ohio
University of Cincinnati College of Law alumni
Women chief justices of state supreme courts in the United States